The maroon-fronted parrot (Rhynchopsitta terrisi) is a large, macaw-like parrot. It is dark green with a dark red shoulder and a maroon forehead and eye-stripe. Its underside of the wings and tail appear to be black when it is in flight. It makes a high, rolling cr-a ak sound. Groups sound similar to the acorn woodpecker if they are heard from a distance.

The species is endemic to northeastern Mexico, where only about 2500–3000 birds survive in the wild.

Taxonomy
R. terrisi is one of two extant and one extinct species of genus Rhynchopsitta of thick-billed parrots.

Description
The maroon-fronted parrot is a large mostly green parrot which measures  in length and weighs . The adults have a dark maroon brow which extends over the rim of bare yellow skin that surrounds the eyes. They have a brighter red at the bend of the wing. The tail is long and pointed. The underside of the wings are blackish. The juvenile has a pale beak, whitish eye-rings, and lack the dark maroon stripe over each eye.

Distribution and habitat
Maroon-fronted parrots live in mature pine, mixed conifer, and pine-oak forests from 2000 to 3500 meters. This bird is endemic to the Sierra Madre Oriental in Nuevo León, Coahuila and Tamaulipas, Mexico.

Behaviour
They nest in limestone cliffs near moving water in large colonies. Breeding coincides with the fruition of pines, which is its main food source.  They lay one to three eggs in July and the juveniles fledge around November. They migrate over short distances seasonally.

Conservation
This bird is considered endangered due to overgrazing and habitat destruction.

The ITESM Campus Monterrey carry out environmental education programs and science research in Cumbres de Monterrey National Park and Sierra de Arteaga for the conservation of maroon-fronted parrots.

References

 Howell, Steven N. G. & Webb, Sophie (1995): A Guide to the Birds of Mexico and Northern Central America. Oxford University Press, Oxford & New York.

External links

Maroon-fronted parrot - Photos by Rene Valdes
ITESM site
Maroon-fronted parrot photo gallery VIREO Photo-High Res

maroon-fronted parrot
Endemic birds of Northeastern Mexico
Birds of the Sierra Madre Oriental
maroon-fronted parrot
Endangered animals